The 2016 United States presidential election in Georgia was held on Tuesday, November 8, 2016, as part of the 2016 United States presidential election in which all 50 states plus the District of Columbia participated. Georgia voters chose electors to represent them in the Electoral College via a popular vote, pitting the Republican Party's nominee, businessman Donald Trump, and running mate Indiana Governor Mike Pence against Democratic Party nominee, former Secretary of State Hillary Clinton, and her running mate Virginia Senator Tim Kaine. Georgia has 16 electoral votes in the Electoral College.

Trump won Georgia by 5.09%, a smaller margin than Mitt Romney's 7.82% in 2012 and even John McCain's 5.20% in 2008. Clinton received 45.64% of the vote, making this one of the few states where she outperformed Barack Obama in 2012, when he received just 45.51% of the vote. This, combined with Trump's reduced margin of victory, made Georgia one of eleven states (plus the District of Columbia) to vote more Democratic in 2016 than in 2012.

The Atlanta metropolitan area in particular shifted strongly towards the Democratic Party, with Clinton becoming the first Democrat to win Henry County since Georgia native Jimmy Carter in 1980 and Gwinnett and Cobb counties since 1976 (when Carter won every county in the state). Trump thus became the first Republican to win the White House without carrying Cobb County since Dwight D. Eisenhower in 1956, as well as the first to do so without carrying Douglas, Gwinnett or Rockdale Counties since Richard Nixon in 1968, and the first to do so without carrying Baldwin, Henry, Newton, or Sumter Counties since Ronald Reagan in 1980. The leftward shift in urban Georgia between 2012 and 2016 foreshadowed Georgia's transition from a Republican stronghold into a competitive (albeit slightly red-leaning) swing state.

Georgia weighed in for this election as 7.23% more Republican than the national average.

Primary elections

The incumbent President of the United States, Barack Obama, a Democrat and former U.S. Senator from Illinois, was first elected president in the 2008 election, running with former Senator Joe Biden of Delaware. Defeating the Republican nominee, Senator John McCain of Arizona, with 52.9% of the popular vote and 68% of the electoral vote, Obama succeeded two-term Republican President George W. Bush, the former Governor of Texas. Obama and Biden were reelected in the 2012 presidential election, defeating former Massachusetts Governor Mitt Romney with 51.1% of the popular vote and 61.7% of electoral votes. Although Barack Obama's approval rating in the RealClearPolitics poll tracking average remained between 40 and 50% for most of his second term, it has experienced a surge in early 2016 and reached its highest point since 2012 during June of that year. Analyst Nate Cohn has noted that a strong approval rating for Barack Obama would equate to a strong performance for the Democratic candidate, and vice versa.

Following his second term, President Obama was not eligible for another reelection. In October 2015, Obama's running-mate and two-term Vice President Biden decided not to enter the race for the Democratic presidential nomination either. With Obama and Biden's terms expiring on January 20, 2017, the electorate was asked to elect a new president, the 45th president and 48th vice president of the United States, respectively.

Democratic primary

Four candidates appeared on the ballot:

Bernie Sanders
Hillary Clinton
Martin O'Malley (withdrew)
Michael Steinberg

Republican primary

The 76 Republican delegates from Georgia were allocated in this way. There were 42 delegates allocated by congressional district; if a candidate received a majority of votes or they were the only candidate to receive at least 20% of the vote in a congressional district, they would receive the districts 3 delegates. If not, the candidate who won the plurality of the vote in a congressional district would receive 2 delegates and the second-place finisher in the district would receive 1 delegate. There were also 34 at-large delegates; if a candidate got a majority of the vote or they were the only candidate to get the mandatory threshold to receive any delegates (begins at 20%, if no one gets at least 20%, then 15%, if no one gets 15%, then 10%), they would get all of the state's at-large delegates. If not, the delegates would be allocated proportionally among the candidates receiving at least the mandatory threshold.

Green convention
On June 4, the Georgia Green Party held its state convention and presidential preference vote.

General election

Predictions

Polling

Throughout the campaign, Republican Donald Trump won the vast majority of pre-election polls. The average of the last three polls showed Donald Trump leading Hillary Clinton 50% to 46%, which was accurate compared to the results.

Statewide results
The voting age population was 7,168,068, of which 5,443,046, were registered to vote. Turnout for the presidential election was 4,146,825, which is 57.85% of the voting age population and 76.19% of registered voters.

Seventeen candidates received write-in votes, of which the large plurality (13,017) went to Evan McMullin.

By county

Counties that flipped from Democratic to Republican 
Baker (largest city: Newton)
Dooly (largest city: Vienna)
Early (largest city: Blakely)
Peach (largest city: Fort Valley)
Quitman (largest city: Georgetown)
Twiggs (largest city: Jeffersonville)

Counties that flipped from Republican to Democratic
Cobb (largest city: Marietta)
Gwinnett (largest city: Peachtree Corners)
Henry (largest city: Stockbridge)

By congressional district
Trump won 10 of 14 congressional districts.

See also

 2016 Democratic Party presidential debates and forums
 2016 Democratic Party presidential primaries
 2016 Republican Party presidential debates and forums
 2016 Republican Party presidential primaries

References

External links
 RNC 2016 Republican Nominating Process 
 Green papers for 2016 primaries, caucuses, and conventions
 Decision Desk Headquarter Results for Georgia

GA
2016
Presidential